Third generation may refer to:

 Third Generation (album), a 1982 album by Hiroshima
 The Third Generation (1920 film), an American drama film directed by Henry Kolker
 The Third Generation (1979 film), a West German black comedy by Rainer Werner Fassbinder
 The Third Generation (2009 film), a Nepalese documentary by Manoj Bhusal
Generation III reactor, a class of nuclear reactor
A group of Pokémon, see List of generation III Pokémon
List of early third generation computers

See also 
 3G, third-generation mobile telecommunications
 Third-generation programming language
 History of video game consoles (third generation) (1983–1995)
 Sansei, grandchildren of Japanese-born emigrants